The Mustard Seed may refer to:

 Parable of the Mustard Seed, a parable told by Jesus
 The Mustard Seed (restaurant), a restaurant in Ireland

See also
 Mustard seed, the seed of the mustard plant
 Kisa Gotami, featuring in a Buddhist story about mustard seeds